Happy Valley is a British crime drama television series created by Sally Wainwright and produced by Red Production Company. The first series of six episodes started airing on BBC One in the United Kingdom on 29 April 2014.  It was released on Netflix in the United States and Canada on 20 August 2014. A second six-episode series began airing on BBC One on 9 February 2016 and was made available on Netflix in the US later that year.

The BBC announced Series 3 on 26 October 2021 with filming scheduled to begin in 2022. Series 3 started airing on BBC One on 1 January 2023.

Series overview

Episodes

Series 1 (2014)

Series 2 (2016)

Series 3 (2023)

Ratings

References

External links
Happy Valley episodes at BBC One
Happy Valley episodes at the Internet Movie Database

Lists of British crime television series episodes
Lists of British drama television series episodes
Lists of crime drama television series episodes
Works by Sally Wainwright